{{DISPLAYTITLE:G2 manifold}}
In differential geometry, a G2 manifold is a seven-dimensional Riemannian manifold with holonomy group contained in G2. The group  is one of the five exceptional simple Lie groups. It can be described as the automorphism group of the octonions, or equivalently, as a proper subgroup of special orthogonal group SO(7) that preserves a spinor in the eight-dimensional spinor representation or lastly as the subgroup of the general linear group GL(7) which preserves the non-degenerate 3-form , the associative form. The Hodge dual,  is then a parallel 4-form, the coassociative form. These forms are calibrations in the sense of Reese Harvey and H. Blaine Lawson, and thus define special classes of 3- and 4-dimensional submanifolds.

Properties 
All -manifold are 7-dimensional, Ricci-flat, orientable spin manifolds. In addition, any compact manifold with holonomy equal to  has finite fundamental group, non-zero first Pontryagin class,  and non-zero third and fourth Betti numbers.

History 
The fact that  might possibly be the holonomy group of certain Riemannian 7-manifolds was first suggested by the 1955 classification theorem of Marcel Berger, and this remained consistent with the simplified proof later given by Jim Simons in 1962. Although not a single example of such a manifold had yet been discovered, Edmond Bonan nonetheless  made a useful contribution by showing that, 
if such a manifold did in fact exist, it would carry both a  parallel 3-form and  a  parallel 4-form,  and that it would necessarily be   Ricci-flat.

The first local examples of 7-manifolds with holonomy  were finally constructed around 1984 by Robert Bryant, and his full proof of their existence  appeared in the Annals in 1987. Next, complete (but still noncompact) 7-manifolds with holonomy  were constructed by Bryant and Simon Salamon in 1989. The first compact 7-manifolds with holonomy  were constructed by Dominic Joyce in 1994. Compact  manifolds are therefore sometimes known as "Joyce manifolds", especially in the physics literature.  In 2013, it was shown by M. Firat Arikan, Hyunjoo Cho, and Sema Salur that any manifold with a spin structure, and, hence, a -structure, admits a compatible almost contact metric structure, and an explicit compatible almost contact structure was constructed for manifolds with -structure. In the same paper, it was shown that certain classes of -manifolds admit a contact structure.

In 2015, a new construction of compact  manifolds, due to Alessio Corti, Mark Haskins, Johannes Nordstrőm, and Tommaso Pacini, combined a gluing idea suggested by Simon Donaldson with new algebro-geometric and analytic techniques for constructing Calabi–Yau manifolds with cylindrical ends, resulting in tens of thousands of diffeomorphism types of new examples.

Connections to physics 
These manifolds are important in string theory. They break the original supersymmetry to 1/8 of the original amount. For example, M-theory compactified on a  manifold leads to a realistic four-dimensional (11-7=4) theory with N=1 supersymmetry.  The resulting low energy effective supergravity contains a single supergravity supermultiplet, a number of chiral supermultiplets equal to the third Betti number of the  manifold and a number of U(1) vector supermultiplets equal to the second Betti number. Recently it was shown that almost contact structures (constructed by Sema Salur et al.) play an important role in  geometry".

See also 
 Spin(7)-manifold
 Calabi–Yau manifold

References

Further reading 
 
 .
.

Differential geometry
Riemannian geometry
Structures on manifolds